Kim Deschênes (born August 7, 1991) is a Canadian ice hockey player, currently signed with the Montreal Force of the Premier Hockey Federation. She played five seasons with the Canadiennes de Montreal of the Canadian Women's Hockey League (CWHL), until the league ceased operations in 2019.

Playing career

For five seasons, Deschênes competed with the Montreal Carabins women's ice hockey program in Canadian Interuniversity Sport play, capturing a national championship 2012.

CWHL
Selected in the first round of the 2014 CWHL Draft, Deschênes participated in the 2nd Canadian Women's Hockey League All-Star Game, which both took place at Toronto's Air Canada Centre. On December 31, 2015, Kim Deschênes and the Canadiennes participated in an outdoor women's ice hockey game against the NWHL's Boston Pride. Known as the 2016 Outdoor Women's Classic it was the first-ever professional women's ice hockey outdoor game. Deschênes would score the first goal of the game.

Deschênes scored a goal as a member of Team Black in the 2nd Canadian Women's Hockey League All-Star Game. She would also appear with Les Canadiennes in the finals of the 2016 Clarkson Cup.

International play
Deschênes participated with Canada in the women's ice hockey tournaments at the 2011 and 2013 Winter Universiade, capturing a gold medal in both events. Among the players named to the 2013 roster, Deschênes was the only returning player from the 2011 team. For the 2013 team, Deschênes was also named as the captain of the Canadian team.

Awards and honors
2011-12 RSEQ Second-Team All-Star

References

External links 

 

1991 births
Living people
Canadian women's ice hockey forwards
Clarkson Cup champions
Competitors at the 2011 Winter Universiade
Competitors at the 2013 Winter Universiade
Ice hockey people from New Brunswick
Les Canadiennes de Montreal players
Montreal Carabins women's ice hockey players
Montreal Force players
People from Bathurst, New Brunswick
Professional Women's Hockey Players Association players
Universiade medalists in ice hockey
Universiade gold medalists for Canada